Anthony Raymond Furst (April 26, 1918September 5, 2009) was an American football player. He played college football at the University of Dayton and professional football for the Detroit Lions during the 1940, 1941, and 1944 seasons.  He also served in the military during World War II and saw combat action during the Guadalcanal campaign.

Early years
Furst was born in Dayton, Ohio, in 1918 and attended Dayton's Chaminade High School.  He played college football for the University of Dayton and was part of the Dayton squad that snapped Western Reserve's 27-game winning streak. After his senior season, he was selected to play in the Chicago College All-Star Game.

Professional football and military service
After graduating from Dayton, he played professional football in the National Football League (NFL) as a tackle for the Detroit Lions. He appeared in 19 NFL games, 10 as a starter, during the 1940 and 1941 seasons. During the 1940 season, he played the full 60 minutes in six games. At 215 pounds, he was one of the lightest tackles in the NFL.

Furst had served in the Reserve Officers' Training Corps at the University of Dayton and was a military reservist. After the attack on Pearl Harbor, he was called to active duty and attained the rank of first lieutenant. He saw combat action in the Guadalcanal campaign, underwent surgery on his veins in New Zealand, and returned to Dayton at the end of 1943.

Furst returned to the Lions in 1944, but appeared in only two games, neither as a starter.

Later years
After retiring from football, he operated a flower shop (Furst Florist) in North Dayton that had been established by his family in 1905. He ran unsuccessfully for Montgomery County Sheriff in 1960 and for the state legislature in 1964. He was inducted into the University of Dayton Hall of Fame in 1965. He died in 2009 at age 91. He was buried at Calvary Cemetery in Dayton.

References

1918 births
2009 deaths
Businesspeople from Dayton, Ohio
Military personnel from Dayton, Ohio
American football tackles
Dayton Flyers football players
Detroit Lions players
Players of American football from Dayton, Ohio
Florists
20th-century American businesspeople
United States Army personnel of World War II
United States Army officers
United States Army reservists